Lauren Danielle Reid (Hangul: 로렌레이드) (born April 16, 1993) is a Filipino-Australian model, actress, events and television host, and blogger with dual Filipino and Australian citizenship. She began her professional career in modelling in 2016 with the influence of her brother James Reid. On July 1, 2016, she joined her current entertainment agency Viva Entertainment since then she has been on major magazine covers in the Philippines.

Lauren is currently expanding her career not just in the Philippines, but also exploring the world of K-pop & Korean entertainment by joining Koffeedream Artist in their upcoming world tours. She will be known as 로렌레이드

Lauren is also known to influence her fans in staying fit and healthy. In her blog (Instagram) laurenreidabook. she was able to encourage her followers to eat healthily exercise frequently and recently she challenged her followers to do 30 days sugar-free challenge.

Radio

Events

T.V. and Cinema

Ambassador & endorser

Newspaper and Magazine

Notes

References 

1993 births
Living people
21st-century Australian actresses
Australian female models
Australian people of Filipino descent
Filipino film actresses
Filipino female models
Filipino people of Australian descent
Australian actresses of Asian descent
Filipino television actresses